The 2005 Gator Bowl was a post-season college football bowl game between the Florida State Seminoles and the West Virginia Mountaineers on January 1, 2005, at Alltel Stadium in Jacksonville, Florida. It was the final game of the 2004 NCAA Division I FBS football season for each team and resulted in a 30–18 Florida State Victory. West Virginia represented the Big East Conference while Florida State represented the Atlantic Coast Conference (ACC).

References

Gator Bowl
Gator Bowl
Florida State Seminoles football bowl games
West Virginia Mountaineers football bowl games
Gator Bowl
21st century in Jacksonville, Florida
January 2005 sports events in the United States